The École de pilotage de l'Armée de l'air (EPAA), or École de Pilotage de l'Armée de l'Air 315 Général Jarry, is the main training centre for pilots of the French Air Force.

History
The EPAA was formed in April 1956.

Training
It is the initial pilot training school of the French Air Force. The aircraft for training are the Pilatus PC-21 and the Grob G 120. The training course is about 100 hours of flying, with 30 hours on the simulator.

Structure
It is situated in the Charente department of the Nouvelle-Aquitaine region.

See also
 École de l'air
 L'équipe de présentation de l'armée de l'air

References

External links
 French Air Force

Aviation schools in France
Buildings and structures in Charente
Education in Nouvelle-Aquitaine
Training establishments of the French Air and Space Force
Military academies of France
Organizations based in Nouvelle-Aquitaine
Flying Training Schools of air forces
French Air and Space Force squadrons